Hanzhong Basin or Hanzhong Pendi, reputed to be "a land of fish and rice", is a geographic region located in the southern Shaanxi.

Hanzhong Basin is a large-scale Cenozoic faulted basin,  and an important agricultural area of southern Shaanxi province.

Landforms
Hanzhong Basin, located in the southwestern Shaanxi, is the largest faulted basin in the upper reaches of the Han River, with the Qinling Mountains to the north and the Daba Mountains to the south. The basin is about 116 km long from east to west and 5~25 km wide from north to south, with a total area of about 2700 km².

Irrigation
The basin has a long history of irrigation, dating back to the first century AD.

Human activities
The era of ancient human activities in the Hanzhong Basin began as late as 600,000 years ago.

References

Landforms of Shaanxi
Landforms of Asia
Basins of Asia
Geography of Shaanxi
Geography of Western China
Geography of Asia